Statistics of North American Soccer League in season 1983. This was the 16th and penultimate season of the NASL.

Overview
There were 12 teams in the league. The Tulsa Roughnecks won the championship. Though Vancouver won two more games than any other club, for the fourth time in league history, the team with the most wins did not win the regular season due to the NASL's system of awarding points.

Changes from the previous season

New teams
Team America

Teams folding
Edmonton Drillers
Jacksonville Tea Men
Portland Timbers

Teams moving
None

Name changes
San Jose to Golden Bay

Regular season
W = Wins, L = Losses, GF = Goals For, GA = Goals Against, PT= point system

6 points for a win in regulation and overtime, 4 point for a shootout win,
0 points for a loss,
1 bonus point for each regulation goal scored, up to three per game.
-Premiers (most points). -Best record. -Other playoff teams.

NASL All-Stars

Playoffs

Bracket

Quarterfinals

Semifinals

Soccer Bowl '83

1983 NASL Champions: Tulsa Roughnecks

Post season awards
Most Valuable Player: Roberto Cabanas, New York
Coach of the year: Don Popovic, Golden Bay
Rookie of the year: Gregg Thompson, Tampa Bay
 North American Player of the Year:  Tino Lettieri, Vancouver
 Soccer Bowl MVP:  Njego Pesa, Tulsa

References

External links
 Video highlights of 1983 season
 Complete Results and Standings

 
North American Soccer League (1968–1984) seasons
1983 in American soccer leagues
1983 in Canadian soccer